Redbox Automated Retail LLC (stylized as redbox.) is an American video on-demand streaming and video rental company specializing in DVD, Blu-ray, 4K UHD rentals and purchases and formerly video games via automated retail kiosks and TVOD, AVOD and FAST services via its website, Android and iOS apps and many consumer electronic devices. Redbox kiosks feature the company's signature red color and are located at convenience stores, fast food restaurants, grocery stores, mass retailers, and pharmacies.

As of the end of November 2012, Redbox had over 42,000 kiosks at more than 34,000 locations. As of September 2016, Redbox had 51.8% market share of the physical rental market. In May 2022, Chicken Soup for the Soul announced its intention to acquire Redbox for $375 million.

History

Redbox Automated Retail LLC was initially started by the McDonald's Corporation business development team. Originally the kiosks sold convenience store products under the name Ticktok Easy Shop, however in late 2003 McDonald's ended its use of the kiosks for these products. Instead, McDonald's executive Gregg Kaplan decided to use the kiosks for DVD rentals, which was tested in Denver in 2004. The company also employed a "return anywhere" policy, different from competitors, which allowed consumers to return their rental to any Redbox kiosk, not just the one from which they originally rented it. Kiosks rented both films and video games.

In 2005, Coinstar bought 47% of the company for $32 million, after unsuccessful attempts to sell half the company to Blockbuster and Netflix. In early 2008, Coinstar exercised an option to increase its share from 47% to 51%. In February 2009, Coinstar paid McDonald's between $169 and $176 million for the remainder of the company. While traditional brick and mortar rental stores were closing at a high rate, Redbox moved into existing retail locations such as supermarkets, and placed kiosks within them or outside of them to gain that consumer base.

The company surpassed Blockbuster in 2007 in the number of US locations, passed 100 million rentals in February 2008, and passed 1 billion rentals in September 2010. Current and former competitors include Netflix, Blockbuster, Movie Gallery and its subsidiary Hollywood Video, West Coast Video and Family Video along with other DVD by mail rental services. In Q2 2011, kiosks accounted for 36% of the disc rental market, with 38% of that attributable to rent-by-mail services and 25% to traditional stores, according to the NPD Group. As of Q2 2011, 68% of the US population lived within a five-minute drive of a Redbox kiosk. The numbers for Q2 2013 shows that Redbox rentals had surpassed 50% of the total disc rentals in the country.

Mitch Lowe joined Redbox in 2003 after spending five years as an executive at Netflix. At Redbox, he started first as a consultant and then as VP of Purchasing & Operations. In 2005, he became the Chief Operating Officer. Lowe owned and operated a video rental company named Video Droid from 1982 through 1997. Video Droid attempted a VHS rental vending machine concept, though the idea was quickly deemed impractical. Lowe was named President of Redbox in April 2009.

With growing concern in 2009 that DVD kiosks might jeopardize movie studio income from DVD sales and rentals, three major movie studios, 20th Century Fox, Warner Bros., and Universal Studios, each refused to sell DVDs to Redbox until at least 28 days after their arrival in stores. Fox and Warner Bros. represented 62% of home video rental revenue in 2008–09. Redbox responded by filing lawsuits, first, against Universal in October 2008, then against 20th Century Fox and Warner Bros. in August 2009. In August 2009, the federal judge hearing the Universal case allowed the antitrust claim to continue. In October 2009, 20th Century Fox and Warner Bros. filed motions to dismiss Redbox's lawsuits against them. During this time, Redbox continued to rent films from these companies, purchasing them at retail from places like Walmart instead of receiving them from the movie studios, which in some cases saved Redbox money due to the discounted prices offered by retailers. Other major studios — Sony Pictures, Paramount Pictures, and Lionsgate — signed distribution deals with Redbox. The Walt Disney Company permits third-party distributors to sell to Redbox, but has not entered into a direct relationship with the company.  Both sides of the studio lawsuits pointed to these revenue-sharing deals to shore up their argument, with Redbox president Mitch Lowe saying, "our growth can lead to theirs [the studios' growth]. For example, Redbox currently estimates we will pay more than a combined $1 billion over the next five years to Sony, Lionsgate and Paramount to purchase and then rent new-release DVDs to consumers," while Warner Bros. says the deals are proof that far from being shut out by Hollywood, "Redbox's business has thrived since its suit against Universal, underscored by lucrative distribution deals with Paramount Home Entertainment, Sony Pictures Home Entertainment, and Lionsgate." Redbox entered into an agreement with Warner Bros. on February 16, 2010, followed by Universal and Fox on April 22, 2010. In the agreements, which settle the lawsuits, Redbox agreed to not make available for rental films from these studios until 28 days after their initial home-video releases. Redbox continued to sign additional and new distribution deals with these and other movie studios; by 2017, titles from Fox and Warner became available on Redbox seven days after their initial home-video release.

In July 2010, Redbox announced that they were beginning to rent Blu-ray movies at 13,000 kiosks nationwide, and Blu-ray Discs were available across the Redbox network by the fall of 2010. In October 2010, the company began testing video game rentals in Reno, Nevada; Orlando, Florida; Stevens Point, Wisconsin; Austin, Texas; Wilmington, North Carolina; and Corvallis, Oregon. In June 2011, Redbox launched video game rentals nationwide.  Games for all major platforms are offered, including PlayStation 4, Xbox One, and Nintendo Switch at select locations. In 2019 Redbox confirmed video game rentals would be discontinued.

In February 2012, Redbox announced the purchase of former competitor Blockbuster Express from NCR for $100 million. The acquisition included over 10,000 DVD kiosks, certain retailer contracts, and DVD inventory. As part of the agreement, Redbox entered a supplier arrangement of purchasing product and services from NCR. On June 27, 2012, Redbox completed the purchase of Blockbuster Express on June 23. The company sold some Blockbuster Express kiosks in less competitive markets to third party providers in June 2013.

The company announced in February 2012 the deployment of kiosks in Canada to test the market there, but in early 2015 shut down their Canadian operation, citing low demand.

The company partnered with New Era Tickets and Sparkart to launch Redbox Tickets in October 2012 as a test on existing kiosks in the greater Philadelphia area followed by an early 2013 expansion in Los Angeles. Redbox also rolled out its Rubi coffee kiosk featuring Seattle's Best Coffee in 2012 at up to 500 locations. Outerwall, formerly Coinstar, decided to close its Rubi business in December 2013 then sold that business in 2014 to Feniks, a Seattle start up food tech company.

In August 2012, Redbox's founder, Gregg Kaplan, exited as president and COO of Redbox. Anne Saunders became the new president of Redbox. In July 2013, Redbox announced its 3 billionth rental of a disc, counting both movies and games. 
 
The number of items rented from kiosks annually peaked in 2013, with 772.87 million rentals. There were then 717.13 million units rented in 2014, and 587.55 million in 2015, the decline due to the increasing consumer shift from physical media to streaming and other online services. That year the company also moved its 1,400 kiosks in Canada to other locations in the United States. As of 2014, Redbox still represented half of the physical media rental market. As of July 2016, Redbox offered Xbox One and PlayStation 4 games.

Apollo subsidiary, acquisition by Chicken Soup for the Soul
Throughout most of 2016, parent company Outerwall was seeking a buyer based on shareholder input. In early September, Outerwall was sold to Apollo Global Management and its three units (Coinstar, ecoATM and Redbox) were split into separate operating companies. In late September 2016, Outerwall CFO Galen Smith was announced as the new CEO of Redbox. The company had approximately 40,000 kiosks in the United States as of January 2017. The kiosks are shifting around the country to different locations in order to track consumer trends and in reaction to under-performing neighborhoods. Most locations only have one kiosk, however in some cases there will be more to deal with high traffic locales.

In 2017, Disney sued Redbox, accusing them of violating copyrights by selling codes to download Disney movies such as Star Wars: The Force Awakens and Beauty and the Beast.

On December 13, 2017, Redbox offered a new video streaming service called Redbox On Demand. The percentage of consumers renting or purchasing movies from Redbox rose in the fourth quarter of 2017 from the third quarter, according to a TiVo survey.

Redbox acquired the independent film Benjamin for a 90-day release period via its kiosks and on demand service on April 23, 2019, as a Redbox Original. In October 2019 Redbox formed its film and TV series production division, Redbox Entertainment, with Marc Danon as senior advisor of content acquisition.

Redbox announced on December 9, 2019, that it would no longer be renting video games but will continue selling used video game copies through the end of the year. Redbox Free Live TV was soft launched in early February 2020 with a nationwide launch on February 18.

The company's revenue fell 20% in 2019, 36% in 2020 and over 50% in 2021.

On May 17, 2021, Redbox announced that it reached a definitive agreement to merge with Seaport Global Acquisition, a special-purpose acquisition company. This would result in Redbox being publicly listed on the Nasdaq under the ticker RDBX. The company officially went public on October 25, 2021.

On May 11, 2022, Chicken Soup for the Soul announced its intention to acquire Redbox for $375 million. The acquisition was completed on August 11, 2022.

At the end of 2022, the company operated about 34,000 kiosks nationwide, and plans to increase that number with 1,000 more kiosks in 2023.

Services

Redbox Free Live TV
Redbox Free Live TV is an ad supported channel based video on demand service. The service was soft launched in early February 2020 with a nationwide launch on February 18. Nearly 30 channels were offered then - three self-branded channels: Redbox Rush (action and adventure), Redbox Comedy and Redbox Spotlight, featured and recommended titles. The service's launch content partner was Lionsgate. Other content suppliers include Cinedigm (Dove Now, Docurama and ConTV), Comedy Dynamics, Fremantle (Family Feud), FilmRise (Unsolved Mysteries, Forensic Files and a collection of movies), Gravitas, Group Nine (NowThis), Jukin Media (FailArmy and Pet Collective), Kabillion, Maverick Movies, People Are Awesome, TMZ, Vin Di Bona Production's AFV and USA Today.

Redbox Instant
Redbox began internally testing a video streaming service, dubbed Redbox Instant, in July 2012. The service was a joint effort between Redbox and Verizon. On March 14, 2013, Redbox Instant by Verizon officially went public, offering customers a free 1-month trial of an $8/month unlimited streaming service that includes 4 disc rentals from kiosks ($1 more for Blu-ray). The service launched with 4,600 titles from movie companies such as EPIX, Lionsgate, NBCUniversal, Paramount Pictures, Relativity, and Sony Pictures. According to early reports, Redbox Instant also planned to allow users to download content to mobile devices for offline viewing; titles could be either rented or purchased, in SD or HD quality, with rental customers having 30 days to begin viewing their title and 48 hours of unlimited views thereafter.

In June 2013, Sony made the official announcement at E3 that Redbox Instant would be available on the PlayStation 4 console, and it was released in late 2013. Android and iOS apps also enabled streaming content on mobile devices.

Redbox Instant disabled sign-ups for new users in mid 2014 owing to a growing number of people using the website to verify stolen credit cards. In Q2 2014 earning call, Outerwall, Redbox's parent company, stated that they were "not pleased" with Redbox Instant subscription numbers. Finally on October 4, 2014, it was announced that Redbox Instant would be shutting down on October 7, only 19 months after its initial launch.

Redbox On Demand
On December 13, 2017, Redbox offered a new service called Redbox On Demand. Like Redbox Instant, it is a streaming service, but based on a different model. It does not require any membership, and the list will contain new releases as well as several titles that it is claimed will never be available on services like Netflix. The service launched with 6,000 titles for on demand rental or electronic sell-through in line with its kiosk operations. The titles come the major film studio's libraries except for Disney plus Lionsgate.

Redbox+
In late December 2020, Redbox began offering a yearly subscription service allowing a subscriber to rent 12 or 24 discs in total, depending on their plan of choice. Only eligible movies can be rented on these plans. It also extends the user return window up until midnight, giving an additional 3 hours to return a movie to a kiosk.

Kiosk design and operation

Redbox began in 2004, using re-branded kiosks manufactured and operated by Silicon Valley-based DVDPlay, at 140 McDonald's restaurants in Denver and other test markets. In April 2005, Redbox phased out the DVDPlay-manufactured machines and contracted the Solectron facility in Creedmoor, NC — later purchased by Flextronics International, in October 2007 (Flextronics is also known as the manufacturer of the Zune, Xbox and Xbox 360) — to create and manufacture a custom kiosk design. The new kiosk was designed by Flextronics' Creedmoor design team, which included engineers Steven Hancock and John Rupert as key contributors under the direction of Franz Kuehnrich at GetAMovie Inc. (which was bought by RedBox). Other key contributors from Flextronics included Flextronics Global Account Manager Dave Stadelmaier and Global Supply Chain Manager Ben Wheeler (The KioskGuy).  Redbox was innovative in that its carousel design not only decreased the number of robotic movements necessary to dispense and restock inventory, it also dramatically increased the number of discs (from 100 to 700+)  that could be stored within a kiosk. In addition, the software, designed and developed by Enterprise Logic Systems, was also innovative in that it allowed RedBox to remotely monitor and manage inventory at all kiosks throughout the country.

The company's typical self-service vending kiosk combines an interactive touch screen and sign. It uses a robotic disc array system containing a stacked carousel of DVDs and web-linked electronic communications.  Kiosks can be located indoors or out and can hold more than 600 DVDs with 70–200 titles, updated weekly.  The kiosks are built as modules, and in areas with higher sales figures, a second machine can be connected to the first one in order to offer a wider selection. The customer pays with a credit card or debit card. DVDs can be returned the next day to any of the company's kiosks; charges accrue up to 25 days, after which the customer then owns the DVD (without the original case) and rental charges cease. Customers can also reserve DVDs online, made possible by real-time inventory updates on the company's website. While customers can buy used DVDs from the kiosks (with unsold used DVDs returned to suppliers), Redbox estimates only 3% of the company's revenue comes from used-disc sales.

A Redbox kiosk rents its average DVD 15 times at an average of $2 per transaction plus any applicable taxes.

Redbox Entertainment
Redbox Entertainment is a content acquisition and production division of Redbox.

On April 23, 2019, Redbox acquired the indie film Benjamin for an exclusive 90-day release period via its kiosks and on demand service as a Redbox Original. In October 2019, Redbox formed its film and TV series acquisition division, Redbox Entertainment, with Marc Danon as senior advisor of content acquisition.

Filmography

with Quiver Distribution
 The Fanatic (August 2019) 
 Running with the Devil (September 2019) 
 The Lost Husband (April 2020)  
 Becky (June 2020) 
 Chick Fight (November 2020) 
 Bandit (September 2022)

with Vertical Entertainment
Capone (May 2020) 
 The Informer (December 2020) 
 Shadow in the Cloud (January 2021) 
 SAS: Red Notice (March 2021) 
 American Traitor: The Trial of Axis Sally (May 2021)

See also

 DVD-by-mail
 Redbox Automated Retail LLC v. Universal City Studios LLLP
 Video rental shop

References

External links

 

Companies based in DuPage County, Illinois
American companies established in 2002
Retail companies established in 2002
Oakbrook Terrace, Illinois
Video rental services
Coinstar
Vending machines
Canadian companies established in 2012
Retail companies established in 2012
Canadian companies disestablished in 2015
Retail companies disestablished in 2015
Companies listed on the Nasdaq
Apollo Global Management companies
Special-purpose acquisition companies
2022 mergers and acquisitions